Pallapadu is a village in the Indian state of Andhra Pradesh. This village belongs to the mandal of Vatticherukuru. It is situated 18 km from the city Guntur.

Demographics and geography
This village has an estimated population of 3000. The people of this village are mainly dependent upon the agriculture. The people cultivate rice, chillis, and cotton mainly because of the nature of land.

The village is located around 76 km to the west of the Bay of Bengal on the east coast of India.

Around 200 families immigrated to the United States from the small village.

References

Villages in Guntur district